Kuniko (written: , , , or ) is a feminine Japanese given name. Notable people with the name include:

 (1209–1283), Empress of Japan
 (born 1962), Japanese actress and television presenter
, Japanese swimmer
 (born 1952), Japanese politician
 (born 1965), Japanese politician
 (1916–1992), Japanese actress
 (1929–1981), Japanese writer and screenwriter
 (born 1972), Japanese Paralympic alpine skier
Kuniko Ozaki (born 1956), Japanese judge
 (born 1954), Japanese politician
 (1947-1985), Japanese manga artist

Kuniko Kato, Japanese percussionist

Fictional characters
, protagonist of the light novel series Shangri-La

See also
7189 Kuniko, a main-belt asteroid

Japanese feminine given names